The Carpentaria Highway is a  highway, which runs from near Daly Waters to Borroloola in the Northern Territory, Australia. It is a sealed road and is part of National Highway 1. The Highway takes its name from the Gulf of Carpentaria, which it links with the Stuart Highway. The Carpentaria Highway also provides road access to the McArthur River mineral deposits and port facilities at Bing Bong, as well as the isolated community of Borroloola and the popular fishing location at King Ash Bay. Funding for maintenance is provided by the Northern Territory government.

See also

 Highways in Australia
 List of highways in the Northern Territory

References

Highways in the Northern Territory
Highway 1 (Australia)